An air aide-de-camp is a senior honorary aide-de-camp appointment for air officers in the Royal Air Force, the Royal Australian Air Force and the Indian Air Force.  Normally the recipient is appointed as an air aide-de-camp to the head of state.  The British Army's equivalent appointment is aide-de-camp general.

Royal Air Force
Recent appointments have included successive Chiefs of the Air Staff, as well as successive Commanders-in-chief, Strike Command (latterly Air Command), prior to the posts being merged in 2012:

Air Chief Marshal Sir Richard Johns (1997–2000)
Air Chief Marshal Sir Peter Squire (1999–2003)
Air Chief Marshal Sir Anthony Bagnall (2000–2001)
Air Chief Marshal Sir John Day (2001-2003)
Air Chief Marshal Sir Brian Burridge (2003–2006)
Air Chief Marshal Sir Jock Stirrup (2003-)
Air Chief Marshal Sir Glenn Torpy (2006-2009)
Air Chief Marshal Sir Joe French (2006–2007)
Air Chief Marshal Sir Clive Loader (2007–2009)
Air Chief Marshal Sir Stephen Dalton (2009-2013)
 Air Chief Marshal Sir Christopher Moran (2009-2010) (died in office).
 Air Chief Marshal Sir Simon Bryant (2010-2012)
Air Chief Marshal Sir Andrew Pulford (2013-2016)
Air Chief Marshal Sir Stephen Hillier (2016-present)

References

Positions within the British Royal Household
Royal Air Force appointments